Neger is German for Negro. Neger may also refer to:
 Neger (Bieke), a river of North Rhine-Westphalia, Germany, right tributary of the Bieke
 Neger (Ruhr), a river of North Rhine-Westphalia, Germany, left tributary of the Ruhr
 Franz Wilhelm Neger (1868–1923), German botanist, mycologist and dendrologist
 Neger (torpedo), a German torpedo-carrying craft during World War II